"Jerusalem of the West" was a term historically used by Jews to describe a non-Jewish city west of Jerusalem where the Jewish diaspora nonetheless enjoyed significant influence, freedom (of religion), and numbers, usually in Western Europe or Maghreb. Possibly its most persistent use was that of the Jews of Amsterdam.

Applications

Amsterdam

In Europe, Amsterdam was commonly associated with the term and was called Jeruzalem van het Westen in Dutch. Sephardic Jews from Spain and Portugal first settled there in the 17th-century and in 1672, there were an estimated 7,500 Jews living in the city. Holland had a reputation of hospitality and tolerance which was rare in Europe at the time. It was "the first city in Europe where Jews were free from persecution and where they enjoyed religious liberty, ample economic opportunities and social equality." The epithet signalled that the Jews felt comfortable in the city.
Prior to the Holocaust, there were about 80,000 Jews living in Amsterdam.

Tlemcen
In Northern Africa, Tlemcen in Algeria was called "Jerusalem of the West". In the 15th-century, the town was considered a major Jewish spiritual centre. André Chouraqui believed that there was a genuine geographical correspondence between the town and Jerusalem. He wrote: "We were living our dream in the midst of the beautiful countryside of the Maghreb. Tlemcen...resembles the city of David in altitude, climate, fauna and flora, to such an extent that we called in the Jerusalem of the Maghreb."

Other
Prior to World War II—Vilnius, Lithuania was known as the Jerusalem of the North. Other towns given the appellation include Toledo and Antwerp. Many others towns in northern Africa were also called symbolically after Jerusalem: Ghardaia, M'zab (Second Jerusalem), Djerba, Tunisia (Ante-chamber of Jerusalem, Jerusalem of Africa), Ifrane, Morocco (Little Jerusalem).

See also 
Nowa Jerozolima (Warsaw), a small village established in 1774 for Jewish settlers in Mazovia, Poland.
Mokum, Yiddish word meaning "safe haven", given to a number of towns in Holland and Germany.
Wenzhou, called "Jerusalem of the East" due to its Christian population.

References 

City nicknames
Historic Jewish communities